Duke's Mayonnaise is a condiment created by Eugenia Duke in Greenville, South Carolina, in 1917.

Duke's Mayonnaise is the third-largest mayonnaise brand in the United States (behind Hellmann's and Kraft), however its popularity was at first largely limited to the South. It is used in regional favorites such as coleslaw, tomato sandwiches, deviled eggs, pimento cheese, and potato salad. Duke's Mayonnaise contains more egg yolks than other mayonnaise products and no added sugar.

Early history
In August 1917, Eugenia Duke and her daughter Martha began selling sandwiches at YMCA-run Army canteens to help make money for her family. Due to requests from soldiers at nearby Camp Sevier which was a National Guard training camp and other customers (she had quickly expanded the places to which she sold her sandwiches), she started bottling her mayonnaise around 1923. Unable to keep up with demand, she sold it to the C. F. Sauer Company in 1929.

With C. F. Sauer
In 1929, the C.F. Sauer Company in Richmond, Virginia, purchased Duke's products and Duke's Mayonnaise became the company's flagship product. The plant is located in Mauldin, South Carolina which is southeast of Greenville. The facility was featured in a How It's Made episode about mayonnaise in 2011.

In 2017, the South Carolina legislature recognized the centennial of Duke's. Duke's Mayonnaise was available throughout the United States, as well as in New Zealand, Australia and the Middle East. In 2017, Sauer announced that it was also starting sales to Latin America.

In 2019, Falfurrias Capital Partners acquired C.F. Sauer and the Duke's brand. Also in 2019, Duke Foods went to court seeking a restraining order trying to "keep former executive Wyatt Howard from using the purloined paperwork to help a competitor." The paperwork referred to included "recipes, formulas, pricing information and other proprietary trade secrets [downloaded] to his personal email account when he was fired in May (2019)."

Eugenia Duke
Eugenia Thomas Slade Duke (October 1881 in Columbus, Georgia–1968) created Duke's Mayonnaise in 1917, in Greenville, South Carolina.

When Eugenia Duke was 18, she married Harry Cuthbert Duke in 1900 and moved to Greenville. She was active in working towards passage of the Nineteenth Amendment to the United States Constitution granting women the right to vote.

After the sale of the company, Eugenia Duke followed Martha to California and opened the Duchess Sandwich Company as well as the Duchess Catering Company.

See also
 Duke's Mayo Bowl
 Duke's Mayo Classic
 List of mayonnaises

References

External links

Brand name condiments
Mayonnaise
1917 establishments in South Carolina
Companies based in Greenville, South Carolina
American companies established in 1917